Kunstleria is a genus of flowering plants in the legume family, Fabaceae. It belongs to the subfamily Faboideae. It grows as a woody climber or liana. There are about 11 species found in tropical Asia and Australia. One species Kunstleria keralensis is found in the southern Western Ghats of India.

References

Millettieae
Fabaceae genera